Petr Čajánek (born August 18, 1975) is a Czech former professional ice hockey forward who played in the National Hockey League (NHL) for the St. Louis Blues, which selected him in the seventh round, 253rd overall, in the 2001 NHL Entry Draft.

Draft 
In the 2001 NHL Entry Draft, he was drafted in the seventh round, 253rd overall, by the St. Louis Blues. He was then signed to an NHL contract.

Career 
Petr Čajánek played for HC Zlín from 1993 to 2002. In the 2001–02 season, he was Czech Extraliga's leading scorer.

On February 26, 2007, Čajánek was placed on waivers by the St. Louis Blues, which would have effectively allowed any other NHL club to sign him. When no other NHL teams tendered Čajánek an offer, the Blues re-signed him to a league-minimum contract, and added him back to their roster. Though he was placed on waivers, the 2006–07 season was his best, as he scored a career-high 48 points, good for third on the Blues.

On October 21, 2007, Čajánek signed a one-year, $900,000 contract to play for Ak Bars Kazan in the Russian Superleague (RSL) for the 2007–08 season.

Career statistics

Regular season and playoffs

International

External links

1975 births
Living people
Ak Bars Kazan players
Czech ice hockey right wingers
HC Dynamo Moscow players
HC Havířov players
SHK Hodonín players
Ice hockey players at the 2002 Winter Olympics
Ice hockey players at the 2006 Winter Olympics
Ice hockey players at the 2010 Winter Olympics
Medalists at the 2006 Winter Olympics
Olympic bronze medalists for the Czech Republic
Olympic ice hockey players of the Czech Republic
Olympic medalists in ice hockey
Peoria Rivermen (AHL) players
St. Louis Blues draft picks
St. Louis Blues players
SKA Saint Petersburg players
Sportspeople from Zlín
PSG Berani Zlín players
Czech expatriate ice hockey players in the United States
Czech expatriate ice hockey players in Russia